Kuntugushevo (Köntügeş) is a rural locality (a village) in Kuntugushevsky Selsoviet, Baltachevsky District, Bashkortostan, Russia. The population was 247 as of 2010. There are 11 streets.

Geography 
Kuntugushevo is located 14 km southeast of Starobaltachevo (the district's administrative centre) by road. Novourazayevo is the nearest rural locality.

References 

Rural localities in Baltachevsky District